The 1950–51 İstanbul Football League season was the 41st season of the league. Beşiktaş JK won the league for the 11th time.

Season

References

Istanbul Football League seasons
Turkey
1950–51 in Turkish football